Ivan Arsov (Bulgarian: Иван Арсов; born 26 September 2000) is a Bulgarian footballer who plays as a defender for Septemvri Sofia.

Career

Septemvri Sofia
On 24 November 2018 Arsov made his professional debut for the team in a league match against Cherno More Varna.

Career statistics

Club

References

External links
 

2000 births
Living people
Bulgarian footballers
Bulgaria youth international footballers
Association football defenders
FC Septemvri Sofia players
FC Pirin Razlog players
First Professional Football League (Bulgaria) players